The 1988 Norwegian Football Cup was the 83rd edition of the Norwegian annual knockout football tournament. The Cup was won by Rosenborg after they beat Brann in the cup final. It took a replay to decide the winner. This was Rosenborg's fourth Norwegian Cup title.

First round

|colspan="3" style="background-color:#97DEFF"|16 May 1988

|-
|colspan="3" style="background-color:#97DEFF"|18 May 1988

|-
|colspan="3" style="background-color:#97DEFF"|19 May 1988

|}

Second round

|colspan="3" style="background-color:#97DEFF"|10 June 1988

|-
|colspan="3" style="background-color:#97DEFF"|11 June 1988

|-
|colspan="3" style="background-color:#97DEFF"|12 June 1988

|}

Third round

|colspan="3" style="background-color:#97DEFF"|6 July 1988

|}

Fourth round

|colspan="3" style="background-color:#97DEFF"|3 August 1988

|-
|colspan="3" style="background-color:#97DEFF"|4 August 1988

|}

Quarter-finals

|colspan="3" style="background-color:#97DEFF"|24 August 1988

|}

Semi-finals

|colspan="3" style="background-color:#97DEFF"|17 September 1988

|-
|colspan="3" style="background-color:#97DEFF"|18 September 1988

|}

Final

First match

Replay match

References
http://www.rsssf.no

Norwegian Football Cup seasons
Norway
Football Cup